is a Japanese manga series written by Riku Sanjo and illustrated by Koji Inada. It takes place in a fantasy world where humans have been suffering from the attacks of the demon-like Vandels. Humans can fight back by becoming a Vandel Buster, a paid monster and Vandel assassin. Beet, is a young boy who becomes a Vandel Buster to be like his heroes, the Zenon Warriors.

The manga ran in Shueisha's Monthly Shōnen Jump from 2002 to 2006. After a nearly ten-year hiatus, the series resumed in Jump SQ.Crown in 2016, before entering a short-term hiatus. It is currently being serialized in Jump SQ.Rise since 2018. In North America, Viz Media licensed the manga for English release and published its first twelve volumes between 2004 and 2007.

A 52-episode anime television series adaptation by Toei Animation was broadcast on TV Tokyo, followed by a sequel, Beet the Vandel Buster: Excellion, which ran for 25 episodes. The anime series was licensed in North America by Illumitoon Entertainment, who only released one DVD in 2007 before discontinuing it.

Story

Set in the Dark Ages, a term referring to the time since Vandels (a portmanteau of "vampire and "devil") appeared and started attacking humans. Beet is a boy who dreams of joining the "Zenon Warriors", a group of "Vandel Busters" who are considered to be the strongest on the continent. When the group comes to protect his village from the Vandel, Beltorze, Beet tries to join them but is rejected. When Beltorze appears, the Zenon Warriors seem to have the upper hand until Beet cheers them on, causing the Vandel to notice his presence. Beltorze attacks Beet, and the Zenon Warriors are forced to break formation to help him. Beltorze uses that moment to attack again, which mortally wounds all of them. Hidden in the smoke, the Zenon Warriors decide to rescue Beet's life by putting their life force into their “Saiga” and giving them to Beet. When Beet complains and asks them why they are doing this, it is revealed that Zenon is Beet's brother. The now weaponless Zenon Warriors then emerge from the smoke and continue to attack Beltorze. When Beet regains consciousness, both Beltorze and the Zenon Warriors are gone. Guilt-ridden and sad, he cries and vows to destroy all the Vandels and end the Dark Ages. He then goes on a three-year training expedition. His childhood friend, Poala, later joins Beet and they form the “Beet Warriors”. As Beet continues his journey, more is learned about the fight between the Zenon Warriors and Beltorze and the fantasy world of Beet is expanded on.

Media

Manga

Beet the Vandel Buster is written by Riku Sanjo and illustrated by Koji Inada. The manga was first serialized in Shueisha's Monthly Shōnen Jump from March 6, 2002, to July 6, 2006. After a nearly ten-year hiatus, the series resumed publication in Jump SQ.Crown on April 15, 2016. However, the series went on hiatus on October 14 of the same year. Jump SQ.Crown ceased publication in January 2018 and the series resumed publication in the inaugural issue of Jump SQ.Rise on April 16, 2018. Shueisha has collected its chapters into individual tankōbon volumes. The first volume was released on October 4, 2002. As of April 4, 2022, sixteen volumes have been released.

In North America, the manga was licensed for English release by Viz Media, who released its first twelve volumes from October 19, 2004, to October 2, 2007.

Anime
Beet the Vandel Buster was adapted into a 52-episode anime television series by Toei Animation, which was broadcast on TV Tokyo from September 30, 2004, to September 29, 2005.

In North America, Beet the Vandel Buster and Beet the Vandel Buster: Excellion were licensed by Illumitoon Entertainment in 2006. However, they only released one DVD in 2007 and discontinued it.

Reception
As of April 4, 2018, the first 13 volumes of the manga had 4 million copies in print.

Notes

References

 Gifford, Kevin. "Beet The Vandel Buster". (January 2007) Newtype USA. Volume 6, Number 1, page 154.

External links
 
 
 

2004 anime television series debuts
2005 anime television series debuts
Adventure anime and manga
Anime series based on manga
Fantasy anime and manga
Manga adapted into television series
Shōnen manga
Shueisha franchises
Shueisha manga
Toei Animation television
TV Tokyo original programming
Viz Media manga